East Preston may refer to:

East Preston, Nova Scotia, a rural area of Halifax Regional Municipality, Nova Scotia, Canada
East Preston, West Sussex, a civil parish in Arun, West Sussex, England
East Preston Cricket Club, a village cricket club based in East Preston, West Sussex, England
East Preston F.C., a football club based in East Preston, West Sussex, England

See also
Preston (disambiguation)